Hans Nielsen Hauge (3 April 1771 – 29 March 1824) was a 19th-century Norwegian Lutheran lay minister, spiritual leader, business entrepreneur, social reformer and author. He led a noted Pietism revival known as the Haugean movement. Hauge is also considered to have been influential in the early industrialization of Norway.

Biography

Hans Nielsen Hauge was born the fifth of ten children in his ancestral farm of Hauge at Rolvsøy (Hauge på Rolvsøy) in the county of Østfold. His father was Niels Mikkelsen Evenrød (1732–1813) and mother Maria Olsdatter Hauge (1735–1811).

He had a poor and otherwise ordinary youth until 5 April 1796, when he received his "spiritual baptism" in a field near his farm.  Within two months, he had founded a revival movement in his own community, written a book, and decided to take his mission on the road. He wrote a series of books in his lifetime. In a total of 18 years, he published 33 books. Estimates are that 100,000 Norwegians read one or more of them, at a time when the population was 900,000 more-or-less literate individuals.

In the next several years, Hauge traveled – mostly by foot – throughout much of Norway. He held countless revival meetings, often after church services. In addition to his religious work, he offered practical advice, encouraging such things as settlements in Northern Norway.  He and his followers were persecuted, though their teachings were in keeping with Lutheran doctrine.  He began preaching about "the living faith" in Norway and Denmark after a mystical experience that he believed called him to share the assurance of salvation with others. At the time, itinerant preaching and religious gatherings held without the supervision of a pastor were illegal, and Hauge was arrested several times.

Hauge faced great personal suffering and state persecution. He was imprisoned no less than 14 times between 1794 and 1811, accused of witchcraft and adultery, and of violating the Conventicle Act of 1741 at a time in which Norwegians did not have the right of religious assembly without a Church of Norway minister present.

His time in prison broke his health and led to his premature death. Upon his release from prison in 1811, he took up work as a farmer and industrialist at Bakkehaugen near Christiania (now Oslo).

In 1815, he married Andrea Andersdatter, who later died in childbirth that same year. In 1817, he married Ingeborg Marie Olsdatter (1791–1872) and bought the Bredtvet farm (now the site of Bredtvet Church in Oslo), where he died. Three of his four children died in infancy. His surviving son, Andreas Hauge, became a  priest in the Church of Norway and Member of the Norwegian Parliament.

Haugean movement

It is generally agreed that Hans Nielsen Hauge had a profound influence on both secular and religious history in Norway. Hauge's message emphasized the type of spirituality he felt originated with Martin Luther. He led charismatic meetings, and his organization became an informal network that in many ways challenged the establishment of the state church. As a result, he and his followers were persecuted in various ways. Hauge was imprisoned on several occasions, spending a total of nine years in prison.

Over time the Haugean movement increased its influence throughout the country. Some figures might illustrate that fact. In the late eighteenth century a normal service at a church in Christiania would be attended by fewer than 20 people – of a population of nearly 10,000. Christianity in Norway was nearly becoming a framework for traditions, and ethics (from a Christian perspective) and spiritual life were nearly non-existent. It is not an exaggeration to state that he revived the faith in most of Norway. Both men women played a central role in this revival. The first female preacher of the Haugean movement was Sara Oust, who was active from the year 1799.

Turning to his achievements as an industrialist, the number of factories and mills that Hauge founded around the country were numerous. All but one disappeared during the industrial revolution, which in Norway took place in the mid-19th century. In 1809, the government temporarily released Hauge from prison so that he could construct salt factories to help alleviate the salt shortage caused by the British Blockade. Even so, his modesty prevented him from becoming a capitalist, and he gave away all he had founded and inspired to others – brethren and friends. During a period of extreme economic crisis, when almost all the prosperous timber barons and iron works owners went bankrupt because of the Napoleonic wars, he showed a way to prosperity for anyone with initiative, and this led to the new rise in Norwegian economics some years after national independence in 1814. In this matter Hauge was but one of several contributors, but he was one of the most influential – especially so in the way he combined economics and Christian morals: modesty, honesty and hard work among them.

Factors in influence
 His defiance toward the religious and secular establishment gave voice to ordinary people, paving much of the way for the liberal and democratic tradition in Norway.
 His theology, while bound in Lutheran doctrine, revitalized the notion of universal religion in Norway.  The Norwegian state church credits him today for making religion a personal obligation.
 His travels created nationwide networks that persist in Norway's political system generally and among parties in particular.
 His advocacy for common people became an important force as the industrial revolution unfolded in Norway.

Legacy
Many Haugeans launched industrial action, such as mills, shipyards, paper mills, textile industry and printing. They had often worked their way up to prosperity in a short time, a result of Haugean focus on diligence, economic enterprise and frugality. Three members of the constitutional assembly in Eidsvoll belonged to his movement.

Because Hauge's preaching coincided with the years during which many Norwegians were migrating to America, the Haugean influence on Lutheranism in America has been considerable. The Lutheran Church in America had a Hauge Synod, Eielsen Synod and Lutheran Free Church all indicative of that influence. Hauge is remembered on the liturgical calendar of the Evangelical Lutheran Church in America on March 29 as one of the Renewers of the Church.

Hauge Institute
The Hauge Institute (Haugeinstituttet) was founded in 2005. The institute seeks to raise awareness about Hans Nielsen Hauge, his ethical thinking and topicality and to impart inspiration to the business and educational community as well as society in general. Based on the thinking and practice of Hans Nielsen Hauge, the Hauge Institute focuses on the ethical dimension in three main areas: leadership, entrepreneurship, and trade and the environment. The Hauge Institute has several professional partners. Two of the most important are St. Olaf College in Northfield, Minnesota and the Norwegian School of Economics in Bergen, Norway.

Selected works
 Betragtning over Verdens Daarlighed, 1796
 Forsøg til en Afhandling om Guds Viisdom, 1796
 De Enfoldiges Lære og Afmægtiges Styrke, 1798
 De sande Christnes udvalgte Psalmebog, 1799
 Den christelige Lære, forklaret over Epistlerne og Evangelierne, 1800
 Forklaring over Loven og Evangelium, 1804
 Om religiøse Følelser og deres Værd, 1817
 Religeuse Sange, 1819
 Huus-Postil, 1822
 Udtog af Kirke-Historien, 1822
 Hans Nielsen Hauges Testamente til sine Venner,  1821

Memorials
Hans Nielsen Hauge Memorial Museum – in Rolvsøy, located between Fredrikstad and Sarpsborg, near the site of his birthplace 
Hans Nielsen Hauge Monument – Concordia College,  located in Founders Court, near Old Main, Moorhead, Minnesota.
Hans Nielsen Hauge Memorial Chapel – Association Free Lutheran Bible School and Seminary, Plymouth, Minnesota.
 Hans Nielsen Hauge Memorial –  Bredtvet Church in Oslo located on the site of the Bredtvet farm
Hans Nielsen Hauge statue – Uranienborg Park in the neighborhood of Uranienborg in Oslo 
Hans Nielsen Hauges vei – street in Rolvsøy
Hans Hauges gate –  street in the Bergenhus borough of Bergen
 Hans Nielsen Hauges gate – street in Hamar 
Hauges gate – street in Drammen
 Hans Nielsen Hauges gate and Hans Nielsen Hauges plass – both streets located in Oslo
 Hans Nielsen Hauge memorial coin – In 2021 a 20 kroner created by sculptor Håkon Anton Fagerås commissioned by Norges Bank, celebrating the 250th anniversary of Lutheran minister.

References

Other sources
Aarflot, Andreas (1979) Hans Nielsen Hauge, his life and message (Augsburg Publishing House, Minneapolis, MN.) 
Arnesen, Daniel (2001) Haugianske vennebrev (P. Øverland)  (Norwegian)
Bull, Jacob Breda (1912) Hans Nielsen Hauge (Kristania: Steen'ske Bogtrykkeri Og Forlag) 
Pettersen, Wilhelm (2008) The Light In The Prison Window: The Life Story of Hans Nielsen Hauge (Kessinger Publishing, LLC) 
Hauge, Alfred (1947) Hans Nielsen Hauge: Guds vandringsmann  (Ansgar)  (Norwegian)
Shaw, Joseph M. (1979) Pulpit Under the Sky: A Life of Hans Nielsen Hauge (Greenwood Press Reprint) 
Sjursen, Finn Wiig (1993) Den haugianske periode, 1796-ca. 1850 (NLA-forlaget)  (Norwegian)
 Thorvaldsen, Steinar  (2010) A Prophet Behind the Plough, Hans Nielsen Hauge and his Ministry(University of Tromsø)

External links

 – a 1961 Norwegian biographical film about Hans Nielsen Hauge
Concordia College, Moorhead, Minn. Sculpture Exhibit
Augsburg College "The Life of Hans Nielsen Hauge"
Luther Seminary. Lay evangelist and leader of a religious awakening in Norway
Hans Nielsen Hauge Museum

1771 births
1824 deaths
People from Fredrikstad
19th-century Norwegian people
19th-century Norwegian writers
Norwegian Christian religious leaders
Lutheran writers
Norwegian Lutherans
Norwegian male writers
Christian revivalists
19th-century male writers
People celebrated in the Lutheran liturgical calendar
Pietists
18th-century Lutheran theologians
19th-century Lutheran theologians